The Little River Reservoir is located in Durham, North Carolina, United States, and is one of the main sources of drinking water for the town.

The reservoir was created by a dam completed in 1988.
It hosts a city park that offers fishing facilities including boat, canoe, and kayak rentals, along with picnic tables and restrooms.  Private boats are not permitted on the reservoir.

Current and historic reservoir water levels can be found below.

In cooperation with Raleigh, Wake Forest, Wendell, and Zebulon in North Carolina, Wake County NC is also planning a reservoir on the Little River.  The project has been postponed for environmental study.

References

Reservoirs in North Carolina
Protected areas of Durham County, North Carolina
Bodies of water of Durham County, North Carolina